Therese or Thérèse is a variant of the feminine given name Teresa. It may refer to:

Persons

Therese
Duchess Therese of Mecklenburg-Strelitz (1773–1839), member of the House of Mecklenburg-Strelitz and a Duchess of Mecklenburg
Therese of Brunswick-Wolfenbüttel (1728–1778), German noblewoman
Therese of Saxe-Hildburghausen, (1792–1854), queen of Bavaria
Therese Alshammar (born 1977), Swedish swimmer
Therese Björk (born 1981), Swedish footballer
Therese Borssén (born 1984), Swedish skier
Therese Brandl (1902–1948), Nazi concentration camp guard. Convicted of crimes against humanity after the war and executed
Therese Brophy,  player
Therese Crawford (born 1976), American volleyball player
Therese Elssler (1808–1878), Austrian dancer and baroness
Therese Giehse (1898–1975), German actress
Therese Grankvist (born 1977), Swedish singer and songwriter also known as Drömhus and Therese
Therese Grob (1798–1875), first love of the composer Franz Schubert
Therese Grünbaum (1791–1876), Austrian soprano and opera singer
Therese Huber (1764–1829), German author
Therese Johaug (born 1988), Norwegian cross-country skier
Therese Lundin (footballer) (born 1979), Swedish footballer
Therèse Lundin (swimmer) (born 1970), Swedish swimmer
Therese Maher, camogie player
Therese Malfatti (1792–1851), Austrian musician and friend of Ludwig van Beethoven
Therese Malten (real name Therese Müller) (1855–1930), German dramatic soprano
Therese Maron (1725–1806), German painter
Therese Murray (born 1947), American state legislator
Therese Neumann (1898–1962), German Catholic mystic and stigmatic
Therese Schnabel (1876–1959), German contralto
Therese Sjölander (born 1981), Swedish ice hockey player
Therese Sjögran (born 1977), known as Terre, Swedish football (soccer) player
Therese Svendsen (born 1989), Swedish swimmer
Therese Torgersson (born 1976), Swedish competitive sailor and Olympic medalist
Therese Vogl (1845–1921), German operatic soprano
Therese Zenz (1932–2019), German sprint canoer

Therése
Therése O'Callaghan, camogie player

Thérèse
Princess Thérèse of France (1736–1744), French Princesse du Sang
Thérèse Albert (c. 1805–1846), French actress
Thérèse Blondeau (1913–2013), French swimmer
Thérèse Bonney (1894–1978), American photographer and publicist
Thérèse Brenet (born 1935), French composer
Thérèse Casgrain (1896–1981), feminist, reformer, politician and senator in Quebec, Canada
Thérèse Caval (1750–1795), French revolutionary
Thérèse Chardin, French hairstylist and celebrity
Thérèse Coffey (born 1971), English politician
Thérèse Couderc, also known as St. Theresa Couderc (1805–1885), co-founder of the Sisters of the Cenacle, a Catholic religious order
Thérèse Daviau (1946–2002), Quebec, Canada politician, an attorney and a City Councillor in Montreal, Quebec
Thérèse Delpech (1948–2012), French intellectual and writer
Thérèse Dion (1927–2020), popularly known as Maman Dion, Québécois television personality, and the mother of pop singer Céline Dion
Thérèse Dorny (1891–1976), French film and theatre actress
Thérèse Elfforss (1823–1905), Swedish actress and theatre director
Thérèse Karlsson (born 1972), Finnish soprano singer and actor
Thérèse Lavoie-Roux (1928–2009), Quebec politician and Canadian Senator
Thérèse Levasseur (1721–1801), domestic partner of French philosopher Jean-Jacques Rousseau
Thérèse Liotard (born 1949), French actress
Thérèse of Lisieux (1873–1897), French saint
Thérèse Meyer (born 1948), Swiss politician
Thérèse McMurray (born 1945), British television actor
Thérèse Oulton (born 1953), English painter
Thérèse Peltier (1873–1926), French sculptor and aviator
Thérèse Quentin (1929–2015), French actress
Thérèse Rein (born 1958), Australian entrepreneur and founder of Ingeus
Thérèse Schwartze (1851–1918), Dutch portrait painter
Thérèse Sita-Bella (1933–2006), Cameroonian filmmaker, pilot, journalist
Thérèse Steinmetz (born 1933), Dutch singer
Thérèse Tietjens (1831–1877), opera and oratorio soprano singer
Thérèse Vanier (1923–2014), veteran and medical doctor
Thérèse Wartel (1814–1865), French pianist, music educator, composer and critic

Fictional characters
 Thérèse Defarge, a villain in Charles Dickens' novel A Tale of Two Cities
 Thérése Dragonheart, the main antagonist of Final Fantasy V.
the title character of Thérèse the Philosopher, a 1748 French novel ascribed to Jean-Baptiste de Boyer, Marquis d'Argens
the title character of Thérèse Raquin, an 1867 novel and an 1873 play by the French writer Émile Zola
the title character of:
 Thérèse Desqueyroux (novel), a 1927 novel by François Mauriac
 Thérèse Desqueyroux (1962 film), an adaptation of the novel
 Thérèse Desqueyroux (2012 film), an adaptation of the novel

See also
Mother Teresa
Saint Therese (disambiguation)
Marie Thérèse (disambiguation)
Maria Theresa (disambiguation)
Teréz Brunszvik (1775–1861), member of the Hungarian nobility, pedagogue
Tess (disambiguation)

Feminine given names
German feminine given names